The  Wabasso Causeway Bridge  is a two-lane concrete bridge spanning the Indian River (Intracoastal Waterway) in Indian River County, Florida.  The bridge was built by Scott Construction Company and was completed in 1970.

The Florida Department of Transportation numbers are 880051 and 880053.

It crosses the Intracoastal Waterway at Statute Mile 943, southeast of unlighted day beacon #80.

The bridge replaced the old drawbridge that was built in 1927.

References
Bridge Information from Florida Department of Transportation
Cruiser Net, Bridge Directory, Southeastern USA Bridge Directory
Indian River Genealogical Society: History - 2007 POSTCARD HISTORY SERIES (Arcadia Publishing)
Indian River County historical timeline from Ancestry.com

Bridges completed in 1970
Road bridges in Florida
Transportation buildings and structures in Indian River County, Florida
Indian River Lagoon
Bridges over the Indian River (Florida)
Concrete bridges in the United States
Causeways in Florida
1970 establishments in Florida